Jonathan Parker Fitch (born February 24, 1978) is an American retired mixed martial artist. He has competed in the Welterweight divisions of the Ultimate Fighting Championship (UFC), the Professional Fighters League (PFL), and most recently for Bellator MMA. In the UFC, Fitch compiled a record of 14–3–1 and once challenged for the UFC Welterweight Championship. In the PFL, Fitch achieved championship success when he won the PFL Welterweight Championship, and he also once challenged for the Bellator MMA Welterweight World Championship.

Background

After graduating from Carroll High School, Fitch enrolled at Purdue University in 1997 and graduated in 2002 with a bachelor's in physical education and a minor in history. As a walk-on to the Purdue wrestling team, Fitch – a four-year letterman – wrestled under the tutelage of Tom Erikson and eventually became the team captain of his wrestling squad. Fitch secured a starting spot early on in his career, but struggled to find initial success. Compiling an 8-23 record his sophomore season, Fitch impressively turned that around to compile an 18-12 record in his final year. He finished with a 45-51 record overall for his collegiate wrestling career.

Tom Erikson– a former PRIDE fighter – would occasionally bring other mixed martial artists to the wrestling gym, and Fitch would be introduced to such fighters as Mark Coleman and Gary Goodridge. The sport, and the money that the high-level fighters were making interested Fitch, and he started his mixed martial arts career in 2002.

Mixed martial arts career
Jon Fitch began his career at light heavyweight with a record of four wins, two losses and one No Contest. Understanding that the sport required cross training in various martial arts, Fitch soon left for San Jose, California to train with the American Kickboxing Academy.

In his next seven fights, Fitch fought at Middleweight and amassed wins over fighters such as Shonie Carter, Alex Serdyukov and Jeff Joslin. After failing to make the selection process for the first season of The Ultimate Fighter – a last-minute decision by the production team that left Fitch stranded in an airport with his luggage already boarded – he earned a shot in the Ultimate Fighting Championship on October 3, 2005, where Fitch defeated Brock Larson by unanimous decision in a middleweight fight.

Ultimate Fighting Championship

Drop to welterweight
Soon after, Fitch dropped down to the welterweight division and won his next seven fights. With victories over Josh Burkman, Thiago Alves, Luigi Fioravanti, Diego Sanchez, and Chris Wilson (tying the record set by Royce Gracie for most consecutive wins in the UFC), Fitch was seen as a top welterweight contender. UFC President Dana White praised Fitch's performances inside the Octagon, and indicated that Fitch would fight the winner of the Georges St-Pierre vs. Matt Serra Welterweight title fight.

Championship fight
Fitch was defeated by Georges St-Pierre via unanimous decision (50–43, 50–44, and 50–44) at UFC 87. After the fight GSP spoke to Fitch about the growth that his own loss prompted and said that Fitch's experience should be no different. Had Fitch beaten St-Pierre he would have had a nine fight winning streak in the UFC, surpassing Royce Gracie's streak of eight straight wins (a record that has since been broken by Anderson Silva, whose winning streak ended at 16 on July 6, 2013). The loss also snapped Fitch's 16 fight winning streak, both in and out of the UFC.

Back to title contention
Fitch was released from the UFC on November 20, 2008. The dispute was over his reluctance to sign a lifetime contract to allow his name and likeness to be used in a video game the UFC released with THQ. In the end, Fitch ended up signing a licensing agreement that will allow the UFC to feature him in their UFC Undisputed video game release and returned to the UFC. Fitch's exile from the UFC lasted less than 24 hours.

Fitch dominated Pride Fighting Championships veteran Akihiro Gono en route to a  unanimous decision victory at UFC 94.

Fitch next defeated formerly unbeaten Brazilian Paulo Thiago via unanimous decision at UFC 100.

Fitch was expected to fight Ricardo Almeida on November 21, 2009 at UFC 106 but, due to a knee injury sustained by Almeida, the fight was cancelled.

Fitch was then scheduled to face Thiago Alves in a highly anticipated rematch on December 12, 2009 at UFC 107. However, Alves suffered an injury and was replaced by Mike Pierce. Fitch won via unanimous decision.

Fitch was expected to finally face Thiago Alves on March 27, 2010 at UFC 111, but on March 25, 2010, Alves was forced off the card due to a brain irregularity that appeared on a pre fight CAT scan. However, Ben Saunders, who was previously scheduled to fight on the same card against Jake Ellenberger, requested that he fight Fitch instead and that fight took place on the main card. Fitch won the fight via unanimous decision.

The Alves/Fitch rematch finally took place at UFC 117. This fight was confirmed to be the number one contendership for the welterweight championship (to fight the winner of the St-Pierre/Koscheck bout). Alves again failed to make weight, weighing in at 171.5 lbs, meaning he had to give up 20% of his fight purse. Fitch went on to defeat Alves via unanimous decision. Dana White later made remarks that the manner of Fitch's victories (primarily judges' decisions rather than finishes) and lack of connection with the UFC fans has put Fitch's number one contender status in doubt. Following Jake Shields' victory over Martin Kampmann at UFC 121, White confirmed Shields as the next in line for the Welterweight title shot, leaving Fitch's status in the division unconfirmed. Fitch thought this funny, considering that Shields' victory was mostly the same as Fitch's previous performances.

Fitch was expected to face Jake Ellenberger on February 5, 2011, at UFC 126. But after B.J. Penn defeated Matt Hughes at UFC 123, UFC president Dana White decided to match Fitch up against Penn at UFC 127 in Australia instead. At the end of the fight the scorecards of the judges were (29–28 Fitch, 28–28, and 28–28). It was declared a majority draw. When asked by Joe Rogan if Fitch would like a rematch, Fitch replied that he wants another title shot more than anything. No confirmation of a rematch resulted from the interview of either fighter.

A rematch with Penn was expected to take place on July 2, 2011, at UFC 132., but in late March, Fitch pulled out of the bout with an injury.

After months of dealing with a shoulder injury, Jon Fitch is back in business. “I’m back! Dr. Kavitne gave me the ok to fight,” he tweeted. Fitch has made no small secret of his desire to fight on the UFC 139 fight card that takes place in his city of residence, San Jose, Calif.

Fitch fought Johny Hendricks on December 30, 2011, at UFC 141. He was knocked out 12 seconds into the fight.

Fitch was expected to face Aaron Simpson on July 11, 2012, at UFC on Fuel TV: Munoz vs. Weidman.  However, Fitch pulled out of the bout citing a knee injury and was replaced by returning veteran Kenny Robertson.

Fitch defeated rising prospect Erick Silva via unanimous decision on October 13, 2012, at UFC 153, with the back-and-forth bout receiving Fight of the Night honors. In a prefight interview, Fitch mentioned that he was experiencing tremendous financial difficulties and that losing the fight would force him to end his full-time training so that he could get a day job to help support his family. After winning the fight, he said the victory had saved his MMA career.

Fitch next faced Demian Maia on February 2, 2013, at UFC 156. Fitch lost by unanimous decision and was subsequently released from the promotion, despite being a top 10 ranked welterweight and having a 14-3-1 record with the promotion overall. Fitch's release from the promotion caused much debate about the UFC "code of conduct" and the general "skill-demand" in UFC, as most commentators had not expected a single loss to lead to a release from the promotion.

World Series of Fighting
On March 7, 2013, it was announced that Fitch signed a four-fight contract with World Series of Fighting.  He made his promotional debut  on June 14, 2013, at WSOF 3, in a rematch against Josh Burkman. Fitch was knocked down by a punch and then finished by Burkman due to a guillotine choke submission. Burkman became the second man to defeat Fitch by a submission, the first being Mike Pyle.

Fitch faced Marcelo Alfaya at WSOF 6 on October 26, 2013, winning via split decision. Despite spending most of the first round trapped in a body triangle defending against submission attempts, Fitch showed improved striking in a back-and-forth fight, dropping Alfaya and following up with heavy ground-and-pound in the third.

In his third fight for the promotion, Fitch faced Dennis Hallman on July 5, 2014 at World Series of Fighting 11. He won the fight via unanimous decision.

In July, Fitch was scheduled to fight Rousimar Palhares at WSOF 11 for the WSOF Welterweight Championship. However, on April 30, 2014, Palhares pulled out of the fight due to personal reasons. The title fight was rescheduled for WSOF 16 on December 13, 2014. He lost the fight by kneebar in the first round. After the fight, it was revealed that Fitch had failed the California State Athletic Commission's pre-fight drug testing. The positive test results of Fitch, who had previously been vocal in his criticism of PED users in MMA, were almost certainly due to synthetic testosterone.

Following his nine-month suspension, Fitch returned to the promotion on October 17, 2015 at WSOF 24. He faced Yushin Okami in the main event for the chance to fight for the vacant Welterweight title.  Fitch won the bout by unanimous decision.

Fitch was lined up to face Jake Shields for the vacant WSOF welterweight championship at WSOF 30 on April 1, 2016. Though they have never competed together in an MMA contest, Shields holds a victory over Fitch in a submission grappling match. However, the match was later cancelled due to contract issues between Shields and the company. Fitch went on to face João Zeferino for the vacant WSOF Welterweight Championship. He won via unanimous decision.

On September 13, 2016, it was announced that Fitch would defend the WSOF Welterweight Championship against Jake Shields on November 12, 2016 at WSOF 34. On October 17, 2016, it was announced that the fight was then rescheduled to take place on December 31, 2016 in the co-main event. Fitch won the fight via unanimous decision.

In his second title defense for the now renamed league, Fitch faced Brian Foster on June 30, 2017 at Professional Fighters League 1, He won the fight in the second round due to submission, his first finish in ten years.

Bellator MMA
Fitch was signed by Bellator MMA, vacating WSOF Welterweight title, on March 1, 2018.

Fitch made his promotional debut against Paul Daley at Bellator 199 on May 12, 2018. He won the fight by unanimous decision.

Fitch next challenged Rory MacDonald in a welterweight title fight that was simultaneously the first round of Bellator Welterweight World Grand Prix at Bellator 220 on April 27, 2019. The back-and-forth bout ended in a majority draw. Due to the fight ending in a draw, MacDonald retained the title and advanced to the semifinals.

Fitch faced Neiman Gracie at Bellator 246 on September 12, 2020. He lost the bout via second round submission and subsequently announced his retirement following the bout.

Personal life
Jon and his longtime girlfriend Michele got engaged the day after UFC 100. The couple were married on September 4, 2010 and had 2 children together, but later divorced in late 2018. 

On December 16, 2014, Fitch was listed as one of three MMA fighters who filed a class-action lawsuit against Zuffa, LLC., the parent company of the UFC.  The suit alleges that the UFC participated in anti-competitive practices that hindered fighters and their mixed martial arts careers.

Film and television
Jon Fitch appeared on the November 5, 2008, episode of MythBusters, "Coffin Punch". The MythBusters were attempting to determine if someone could punch their way out of a coffin. For his part, Jon Fitch laid on his back and punched up into a sensor, attached to a punching bag that was a few inches above Fitch, allowing his arm only three inches of travel before contact with the sensor. The sensor read that the power behind Fitch's punch was just under 1,500 pounds of force (6672 N).

Fitch also made a brief cameo in the award-winning mixed martial arts documentary Fight Life sparring with Jake Shields. The film was directed by James Z. Feng and released in 2013.
Fitch is the main subject of the movie Such Great Heights which documents his preparations to fight Georges St. Pierre at UFC 87.  The film was directed by Jonah Tulis and released in 2012.

Championships and Accomplishments

Ultimate Fighting Championship
Fight of the Night (Two times)
Fought for UFC Welterweight Title (UFC 87)

World Series of Fighting/Professional Fighters League
WSOF Welterweight Championship (One time)
Two successful title defenses
Oldest Champion in WSOF/PFL history (38 years 40 days)
Most decision wins in WSOF/PFL history (5)

Mixed martial arts record

|-
| Loss
|align=center|32–8–2 (1)
|Neiman Gracie
|Submission (heel hook)
|Bellator 246
|
|align=center|2
|align=center|4:47
|Uncasville, Connecticut, United States
|
|-
| Draw
| align=center| 32–7–2 (1)
| Rory MacDonald
| Draw (majority)
| Bellator 220
| 
| align=center| 5
| align=center| 5:00
| San Jose, California, United States 
| 
|- 
| Win
| align=center| 32–7–1 (1)
| Paul Daley
| Decision (unanimous)
| Bellator 199
| 
| align=center| 3
| align=center| 5:00
| San Jose, California, United States
|
|- 
| Win
| align=center| 31–7–1 (1)
| Brian Foster
| Submission (bulldog choke)
| PFL: Daytona
| 
| align=center| 2
| align=center| 3:12
| Daytona Beach, Florida, United States
| 
|- 
| Win
| align=center| 30–7–1 (1)
| Jake Shields
| Decision (unanimous)
| WSOF 34
| 
| align=center| 5
| align=center| 5:00
| New York City, New York, United States
| 
|-
| Win
| align=center| 29–7–1 (1)
| João Zeferino
| Decision (unanimous)
| WSOF 30
| 
| align=center| 5
| align=center| 5:00
| Las Vegas, Nevada, United States
| 
|-
| Win
| align=center| 28–7–1 (1)
| Yushin Okami
| Decision (unanimous)
| WSOF 24
| 
| align=center| 3
| align=center| 5:00
| Mashantucket, Connecticut, United States
| 
|-
| Loss
| align=center| 27–7–1 (1)
| Rousimar Palhares
| Submission (kneebar)
| WSOF 16
| 
| align=center| 1
| align=center| 1:30
| Sacramento, California, United States
|  
|-
| Win
| align=center| 27–6–1 (1)
| Dennis Hallman
| Decision (unanimous)
| WSOF 11
| 
| align=center| 3
| align=center| 5:00
| Daytona Beach, Florida, United States
|  
|-
| Win
| align=center| 26–6–1 (1)
| Marcelo Alfaya
| Decision (split)
| WSOF 6
| 
| align=center| 3
| align=center| 5:00
| Coral Gables, Florida, United States
|
|-
| Loss
| align=center| 25–6–1 (1)
| Josh Burkman
| Technical Submission (guillotine choke)
| WSOF 3
| 
| align=center| 1
| align=center| 0:41
| Las Vegas, Nevada, United States
|
|-
| Loss
| align=center| 25–5–1 (1)
| Demian Maia
| Decision (unanimous)
| UFC 156
| 
| align=center| 3
| align=center| 5:00
| Las Vegas, Nevada, United States
|
|-
| Win
| align=center| 25–4–1 (1)
| Erick Silva
| Decision (unanimous)
| UFC 153
| 
| align=center| 3
| align=center| 5:00
| Rio de Janeiro, Rio de Janeiro, Brazil
| 
|-
| Loss
| align=center| 24–4–1 (1)
| Johny Hendricks
| KO (punch)
| UFC 141
| 
| align=center| 1
| align=center| 0:12
| Las Vegas, Nevada, United States
|
|-
| Draw
| align=center|  (1)
| B.J. Penn
| Draw (majority)
| UFC 127
| 
| align=center| 3
| align=center| 5:00
| Sydney, New South Wales, Australia
|
|-
| Win
| align=center| 24–3 (1)
| Thiago Alves
| Decision (unanimous)
| UFC 117
| 
| align=center| 3
| align=center| 5:00
| Oakland, California, United States
| 
|-
| Win
| align=center| 23–3 (1)
| Ben Saunders
| Decision (unanimous)
| UFC 111
| 
| align=center| 3
| align=center| 5:00
| Newark, New Jersey, United States
|
|-
| Win
| align=center| 22–3 (1)
| Mike Pierce
| Decision (unanimous)
| UFC 107
| 
| align=center| 3
| align=center| 5:00
| Memphis, Tennessee, United States
|
|-
| Win
| align=center| 21–3 (1)
| Paulo Thiago
| Decision (unanimous)
| UFC 100
| 
| align=center| 3
| align=center| 5:00
| Las Vegas, Nevada, United States
|
|-
| Win
| align=center| 20–3 (1)
| Akihiro Gono
| Decision (unanimous)
| UFC 94
| 
| align=center| 3
| align=center| 5:00
| Las Vegas, Nevada, United States
|
|-
| Loss
| align=center| 19–3 (1)
| Georges St-Pierre
| Decision (unanimous)
| UFC 87
| 
| align=center| 5
| align=center| 5:00
| Minneapolis, Minnesota, United States
| 
|-
| Win
| align=center| 19–2 (1)
| Chris Wilson
| Decision (unanimous)
| UFC 82
| 
| align=center| 3
| align=center| 5:00
| Columbus, Ohio, United States
|
|-
| Win
| align=center| 18–2 (1)
| Diego Sanchez
| Decision (split)
| UFC 76
| 
| align=center| 3
| align=center| 5:00
| Anaheim, California, United States
|
|-
| Win
| align=center| 17–2 (1)
| Roan Carneiro
| Submission (rear-naked choke)
| UFC Fight Night 10
| 
| align=center| 2
| align=center| 1:07
| Hollywood, Florida, United States
|
|-
| Win
| align=center| 16–2 (1)
| Luigi Fioravanti
| Submission (rear-naked choke)
| UFC 68
| 
| align=center| 2
| align=center| 3:05
| Columbus, Ohio, United States
|
|-
| Win
| align=center| 15–2 (1)
| Kuniyoshi Hironaka
| Decision (unanimous)
| UFC 64
| 
| align=center| 3
| align=center| 5:00
| Las Vegas, Nevada, United States
|
|-
| Win
| align=center| 14–2 (1)
| Thiago Alves
| TKO (upkick and punches)
| UFC Fight Night 5
| 
| align=center| 2
| align=center| 4:37
| Las Vegas, Nevada, United States
|
|-
| Win
| align=center| 13–2 (1)
| Josh Burkman
| Submission (rear-naked choke)
| UFC Fight Night 4
| 
| align=center| 2
| align=center| 4:57
| Las Vegas, Nevada, United States
|
|-
| Win
| align=center| 12–2 (1)
| Brock Larson
| Decision (unanimous)
| UFC Fight Night 2
| 
| align=center| 3
| align=center| 5:00
| Las Vegas, Nevada, United States
|
|-
| Win
| align=center| 11–2 (1)
| Jeff Joslin
| Decision (split)
| Freedom Fight
| 
| align=center| 3
| align=center| 5:00
| Hull, Quebec, Canada
|
|-
| Win
| align=center| 10–2 (1)
| Alex Serdyukov
| TKO (punches)
| rowspan=3| MMA Mexico 1
| rowspan=3| 
| align=center| 2
| align=center| 2:15
| rowspan=3| Ciudad Juárez, Chihuahua, Mexico
|
|-
| Win
| align=center| 9–2 (1)
| Jorge Ortiz
| Decision (unanimous)
| align=center| 3
| align=center| 5:00
|
|-
| Win
| align=center| 8–2 (1)
| Mike Seal
| TKO (punches)
| align=center| 2
| align=center| 2:35
|
|-
| Win
| align=center| 7–2 (1)
| Kengo Ura
| Decision (unanimous)
| Venom 1
| 
| align=center| 2
| align=center| 5:00
| Las Vegas, Nevada, United States
|
|-
| Win
| align=center| 6–2 (1)
| Shonie Carter
| Submission (slam)
| Shooto USA
| 
| align=center| 3
| align=center| 0:41
| Las Vegas, Nevada, United States
| 
|-
| Win
| align=center| 5–2 (1)
| Gabe Garcia
| TKO (punches)
| X–1
| 
| align=center| 1
| align=center| 2:41
| Yokohama, Japan
|
|-
| Win
| align=center| 4–2 (1)
| Kyle Jensen
| Decision (unanimous)
| Battleground 1
| 
| align=center| 3
| align=center| 5:00
| Chicago, Illinois, United States
|
|-
| NC
| align=center| 3–2 (1)
| Solomon Hutcherson
| NC (cut due to illegal kick)
| HOOKnSHOOT 1.1
| 
| align=center| 2
| align=center| N/A
| Evansville, Indiana, United States
| 
|-
| Loss
| align=center| 3–2
| Wilson Gouveia
| KO (knee)
| HOOKnSHOOT 1
| 
| align=center| 1
| align=center| 3:38
| Fort Lauderdale, Florida, United States
|
|-
| Win
| align=center| 3–1
| Eric Tix
| KO (punch)
| rowspan=2| UW
| rowspan=2| 
| align=center| 1
| align=center| 0:07
| rowspan=2| Fridley, Minnesota, United States
|
|-
| Win
| align=center| 2–1
| Dan Hart
| Submission (guillotine choke)
| align=center| 1
| align=center| 1:14
|
|-
| Win
| align=center| 1–1
| Felix Alvarez
| KO (punch)
| MMA - Cuando Hierve la Sangre
| 
| align=center| 1
| align=center| 0:10
| Monterrey, Nuevo León, Mexico
|
|-
| Loss
| align=center| 0–1
| Mike Pyle
| Submission (rear-naked choke)
| Revolution Fighting Championship 1
| 
| align=center| 1
| align=center| 2:35
| Las Vegas, Nevada, United States
|

References

External links

Official UFC Profile
Homepage of Jon Fitch

Official Jon Fitch Facebook Fan Page
Official Jon Fitch YouTube Videos
Michele Cao Fitch Biography
Official Jon Fitch Tee KO Page

American male mixed martial artists
American sportspeople in doping cases
American practitioners of Brazilian jiu-jitsu
People awarded a black belt in Brazilian jiu-jitsu
Doping cases in mixed martial arts
Mixed martial artists from Indiana
Sportspeople from San Jose, California
Sportspeople from Fort Wayne, Indiana
Purdue University alumni
Welterweight mixed martial artists
Mixed martial artists utilizing collegiate wrestling
Mixed martial artists utilizing Brazilian jiu-jitsu
1978 births
Living people
Ultimate Fighting Championship male fighters